The ICW Southeastern Heavyweight Championship was a secondary singles championship in International Championship Wrestling. Because the championship is a professional wrestling championship, it is not won or lost competitively but instead by the decision of the bookers of a wrestling promotion. The championship is awarded after the chosen team "wins" a match to maintain the illusion that professional wrestling is a competitive sport.

Title history

Footnotes

References

International Championship Wrestling championships
United States regional professional wrestling championships